Zarnan (also Romanized as Zarnān; also known as Zarna) is a village in Silakhor-e Sharqi Rural District, in the Central District of Azna County, Lorestan Province, Iran. At the 2006 census, its population was 647, in 141 families. The Bayat, Rezaei and Bahmanesh families are educated and artistic families of this village

References 

Towns and villages in Azna County